Holley Rubinsky (1943 – 2015) was an American-born Canadian fiction writer who lived in Kaslo, British Columbia.

Biography
Holley Rubinsky was born in Los Angeles, California. She came to British Columbia in 1976 with her daughter, the artist and children's book writer, Robin Ballard.

The title story of Rubinsky's first book, Rapid Transits and Other Stories (Polestar, 1991), won the first $10,000 Journey Prize (1989), as well as the Canadian National Magazine Awards Gold Medal for fiction and a nomination for the Western Magazines Award. At First I Hope for  Rescue (Knopf Canada, 1997; Picador, 1998) was shortlisted for B.C.'s Ethel Wilson Fiction Prize, and was chosen for the Barnes & Noble Booksellers "Discover great new writers program". Beyond This Point was published by McClelland & Stewart in 2006. Her collection of short fiction, "South of Elfrida" (Brindle & Glass) was published in 2013.

From 2006-2008, Rubinsky was host of The Writers' Show produced by CJLY-FM, Kootenay Coop Radio, a weekly program about the process of writing and experiences in publishing.

Rubinsky died in August 2015.

Since 2016, Rubinsky has been memorialized by the Holley Rubinsky Blue Pencil Sessions at the annual Elephant Mountain Literary Festival in Nelson, B.C.

Bibliography
 Rapid Transit and Other Stories. Vancouver: Polestar, 1991.
 At First I Hope For Rescue. Toronto: Knopf Canada, 1997; New York: Picador, 1998.
 Beyond this Point. Toronto: McClelland & Stewart, 2006.
 South of Elfrida. Victoria: Brindle & Glass, 2013.

References

External links
Holley Rubinsky's website
Holley Rubinsky at Random House of Canada
Publisher's website for Beyond This Point
Publisher's website for "South of Elfrida"

1943 births
2015 deaths
American emigrants to Canada
Writers from British Columbia
20th-century Canadian novelists
21st-century Canadian novelists
Canadian women novelists
Place of birth missing
Canadian women short story writers
20th-century Canadian women writers
21st-century Canadian women writers
20th-century Canadian short story writers
21st-century Canadian short story writers